Punctelia involuta is a species of foliose lichen in the family Parmeliaceae. Found in Brazil, it was described as a new species in 2010 by Luciana Canêz and Marcelli Marcelo. It is a member of the Punctelia microsticta species group, a set of related Punctelia lichens with a black lower surface and similar morphology. The type specimen of Punctelia involuta was collected in São Luiz do Paraitinga at the Serra do Mar State Park.

They are involute (with the margins curled inwards somewhat), a feature for which the species is named. The medulla is white, while the lower surface of the thallus is black. Soralia and isidia are absent from the thallus surface. The conidia made by the lichen have a short threadlike (filiform) shape, and measure 7–9 μm.

In terms of reactivity to standard lichen spot tests, the upper cortex of Punctelia involuta is K+ (yellow, indicating the presence of atranorin), UV−; the medulla is K−, C–, KC−, P−, and UV−. The C− result of the medulla is one of the defining characteristics of this species that helps to distinguish it from other members in the Punctelia microsticta group.

References

involuta
Lichen species
Lichens described in 2010
Lichens of Brazil